Ruhijärv is a lake in Mulgi Parish, Viljandi County, Estonia. The river Rūja starts from Ruhijärv.

See also
List of lakes of Estonia

References

Mulgi Parish
Lakes of Viljandi County